For One Night Only is an Irish light entertainment show hosted by Gay Byrne. It features music and chat with a special guest musician. The studio-based show originally aired on Friday nights as a summer "filler" in 2011. The show returned for a second series in 2012.

History
Following Gay Byrne's retirement as host of The Late Late Show in 1999 he has occasionally returned to present numerous shows from time to time.  These have included The Gay Byrne Music Show, Who Wants to be a Millionaire?, Make 'Em Laugh, Class Reunion, Gaybo's Grumpy Men and The Meaning of Life.  Many of these shows have often reflected Byrne's own personal interest in a particular subject.

Production
The first series of For One Night Only was recorded before an audience of 180 in Studio 4 in the RTÉ Television Centre at Donnybrook, Dublin 4. The shows are usually broadcast on Friday nights during July and August, immediately after the RTÉ News: Nine O'Clock at 9:35 p.m.

Format
For One Night Only is described as giving an "intimate and emotional look at the featured artist's life story."  The show offers a This Is Your Life-style interview with a special guest musician and is punctuated by performances by that musician.

Christmas special
A special Christmas edition was broadcast on 25 December 2011 as a tribute to The Dubliners 50th anniversary. The show featured Declan O'Rourke, Sharon Shannon, Shane MacGowan, Mary Coughlan and Liam Ó Maonlaí.

Broadcast dates

Series 1

Special

Series 2

Specials

References

External links
Official Site at RTÉ

2011 Irish television series debuts
Irish music television shows
Irish television talk shows
RTÉ original programming